Reiff is a former settlement in Lake County, California.

A post office operated at Reiff from 1881 to 1918, moving in 1891 and 1899, and from 1923 to 1941. The name honored John Reiff, its first postmaster.

References

Former settlements in Lake County, California
Former populated places in California